Jefferson Cepeda is the name of two Ecuadorian cyclists:

Jefferson Alveiro Cepeda (born 1996)
Jefferson Alexander Cepeda (born 1998)